Walter Alden Dyer (October 10, 1878 in Roslindale, Boston, Massachusetts – June 20, 1943) was an American author and journalist.

He joined the staff of the Springfield Union in Springfield, Massachusetts in 1901, edited many publications, and became managing editor of Country Life in America (1906–1914). He was one of the most famous writers of dog stories. He was a prolific writer who contributed many articles to magazines, and published various works, including:

 The Lure of the Antique (1910)
 The Richer Life (1911)
 Pierrot, Dog of Belgium (1915), French title: Pierro, chien de Belgique
 Creators of Decorative Styles (1917)
 Handbook of Furniture Styles (1918)
 Sons of Liberty (1920)
 Gulliver the Great(1916)
 The River Life (1911)
 Dogs of Boytown (1918)
 Many Dogs There Be (1924)
 All Around Robin Hood's Barn: a Canine Idyll (1926)
 The Breakwater (1927)
 Sprigs of Hemlock (1931)

His parents were Ebenezer Porter Dyer, Jr. and Martha Augusta Fearing. He graduated from Amherst College Class of 1900. The Archives and Special Collections at Amherst College holds some of his papers.

References

External links
 
 
 
 Walter Alden Dyer (AC 1900) Papers from the Amherst College Archives & Special Collections

American male journalists
Amherst College alumni
Writers from Boston
Writers from Springfield, Massachusetts
1878 births
1943 deaths
Place of death missing
People from Roslindale